Raoul Bénard (30 September 1881 – 24 July 1961) was a French sculptor. His work was part of the sculpture event in the art competition at the 1924 Summer Olympics.

References

1881 births
1961 deaths
19th-century French sculptors
20th-century French sculptors
20th-century French male artists
French male sculptors
Olympic competitors in art competitions
People from Elbeuf
19th-century French male artists